Frederick George Ekins (born 9 September 1871) was an English footballer.

Career

Ekins started his career with two local teams; first New Brompton Rovers, and then Chatham. In 1891 he joined Football League side Derby County, where he spent two years before moving to Burton Swifts. After two seasons with Burton, he was transferred to Luton Town, of the Southern League. Two years later, Luton Town were elected to the Football League, and Ekins spent two more seasons with them before retiring.

References

1871 births
People from Gillingham, Kent
English footballers
English Football League players
Southern Football League players
Derby County F.C. players
Burton Swifts F.C. players
Luton Town F.C. players
Year of death missing
Association football wingers